The Twa (also Cwa, or Batwa plural and Mutwa singular) are a group of  indigenous African Pygmy (Central African foragers)  tribes.

Name

It is often supposed that the Pygmies were the aboriginal inhabitants of the forest before the advent of agriculture. Vansina argues that the original meaning of the (Proto-Bantu) word *twa was "hunter-gatherer, bushpeople", alongside yaka used for the western (Mbuti) pygmies (Bayaka). As the Twa developed into full-time hunter-gatherers, the words were conflated, and the ritual role of the absorbed aboriginal peoples  was transferred to the Twa. Batwa and Abatwa are  Bantu plural forms, translating to "Twa people".

Relation to the Bantu populations

All Pygmy and Twa populations live near or in agricultural villages. Agricultural Bantu peoples have settled a number of ecotones next to an area that has game but will not support agriculture, such as the edges of the rainforest, open swamp, and desert. The Twa spend part of the year in the otherwise uninhabited region hunting game, trading for agricultural products with the farmers while they do so.

Roger Blench has proposed that Twa (Pygmies) originated as a caste like they are today, much like the Numu blacksmith castes of West Africa, economically specialized groups which became endogamous and consequently developed into separate ethnic groups, sometimes, as with the Ligbi, also their own languages. A mismatch in language between patron and client could later occur from population displacements. The short stature of the "forest people" could have developed in the millennia since the Bantu expansion, as happened also with Bantu domestic animals in the rainforest. Perhaps there was additional selective pressure from farmers taking the tallest women back to their villages as wives. However, that is incidental to the social identity of the Pygmy/Twa.

Congo

Twa live scattered throughout the Congo. In addition to the Great Lakes Twa of the dense forests under the Ruwenzoris, there are notable populations in the swamp forest around Lake Tumba in the west (about 14,000 Twa, more than the Great Lakes Twa in all countries), in the forest–savanna swamps of Kasai in the south-center, and in the savanna swamps scattered throughout Katanga in the south-east, as in the Upemba Depression with its floating islands, and around Kiambi on the Luvua River.

The island of Idwji has a native population of approx 7000 BaTwa. And according to UNHRW more than 10000 BaTwa are displaced from Virunga Park in the Northern Kivu province's refugee camps such as Mugunga and Mubambiro because of decades of war. 

The term Batwa is used to cover a number of different cultural groups, while many Batwa in various parts of the DRC call themselves Bambuti.

Arab and colonial accounts speak of Twa on either side of the Lomami River southwest of  Kisangani, and on the Tshuapa River and its tributary the "Bussera".

Among the Mongo, on the rare occasions of caste mixing, the child is raised as Twa. If this is a common pattern with Twa groups, it may explain why the Twa are less physically distinct from their patrons than the Mbenga and Mbuti, where village men take Pygmy women out of the forest as wives. The Congolese variant of the name, at least in Mongo, Kasai, and Katanga, is Cwa.

Uganda

The Batwa of Uganda were forest dwellers who lived by gathering and hunting as their main source of food. They are believed to have lived in the Bwindi Impenetrable and Mgahinga National parks that border the Democratic Republic of Congo (DRC) and Rwanda living mainly in areas bordering other Bantu Tribes.

In 1992 the Bwindi Impenetrable Forest became a national park and a World Heritage Site to protect the 350 endangered mountain gorillas within its boundaries. As a result the Batwa were evicted from the park. Since they had no title to the land, they were given no compensation. The Batwa became conservation refugees in an unforested environment  unfamiliar to them. Poverty, drugs and alcohol abuse were rampant, as well as a lack of education facilities, HIV as well as gender-based violence and discrimination were higher among Batwa communities than among the neighboring Bantu communities.

Angola and Namibia
Southern Angola through central Namibia had Twa populations when Europeans first arrived in the 16th century. Estermann writes,
 These peoples live in desert environments. Accounts are limited and tend to confuse the Twa with the San.

Zambia and Botswana

The Twa of these countries live in swampy areas, such as the Twa fishermen of the Bangweulu Swamps, Lukanga Swamp, and Kafue Flats of Zambia; only the Twa fish in Southern Province, where the swampy terrain means that large-scale crops cannot be planted near the best fishing grounds.

The geneticist Cavalli-Sforza also shows Twa near Lake Mweru on the Zambia–Congo border. There are two obvious possibilities: the Luapula Swamps, and the swamps of Lake Mweru Wantipa. The latter is Taabwa territory, and the Twa are reported to live among the Taabwa. The former is reported to be the territory of Bemba-speaking Twa.

See also
Pygmies
Classification of Pygmy languages

Notes

References

Further reading
 
 
 

African Pygmies
Ethnic groups in Angola]
Ethnic groups in Botswana
Ethnic groups in Namibia
Ethnic groups in the Democratic Republic of the Congo
Ethnic groups in Zambia